The Goldney Baronetcy, of Beechfield in the Parish of Corsham and Bradenstoke Abbey in the Parish of Lyneham, both in the County of Wiltshire, was a title in the Baronetage of the United Kingdom. It was created on 11 May 1880 for Gabriel Goldney, Conservative Member of Parliament for Chippenham. The title became extinct on the death of the fourth Baronet in 1974.

Sir John Goldney, Chief Justice of Trinidad and Tobago, was the third son of the first Baronet.

Armorial

Goldney baronets, of Beechfield and Bradenstoke Abbey (1880)
 Sir Gabriel Goldney, 1st Baronet (1813–1900)
 Sir Gabriel Prior Goldney, 2nd Baronet (1843–1925)
 Sir Frederick Hastings Goldney, 3rd Baronet (1845–1940)
 Sir Henry Hastings Goldney, 4th Baronet (1886–1974)

References

Extinct baronetcies in the Baronetage of the United Kingdom
History of Wiltshire
Baronets